Daniel du Janerand (18 July 1919 – 19 July 1990) was a French painter, muralist, and book illustrator.

Artistic life
He was  born in the "Marais", center of Paris, on 18 July 1919. He studied at the École nationale supérieure des Beaux-Arts (National School of Fine Art) in Paris. He was a founder member of the Salon "Comparaisons" and a member of the Salon d'Automne, Salon de la Société Nationale des Beaux Arts (Fine Arts National Society), and the Salon des Peintres Témoins de leur Temps (Painters Witnesses of their Time).

Daniel du Janerand exhibited in France, and internationally in the USA, Great Britain, Belgium, Germany, Switzerland, Canada, Mexico, Italy, Spain, Russia, and Japan. His work is in museum collections in Fontainebleau, Lyon, Poitiers, Valenciennes, Villeneuve sur Lot, Créon, Gassin, and Saint-Maur des Fossés.

Awards
Prix de la revue "Le Peintre" ("The Painter" magazine) (1953)
Prix de la Société des Amateurs d'Art et des Collectionneurs (1955)
Prix Puvis de Chavannes (1970)
Prix de Saint-Affrique (1984)
Pictures bought by the State, Town of Paris, Museums of Valenciennes, Lyon, Créon, Fontainebleau

Wall paintings 
He created murals in French public and grammar schools; eight mural paintings for radio-industry Thomson in Paris, and in 1985, one for S.N.C.F. (French railways company) at Quimper (Brittany).

Book illustrations 
 "Le Chemin des Dames" by J.Rousselot
 "Feu d'artifice à Zanzibar" (Fireworks in Zanzibar) by Pierre Benoît
 "Lève-toi et marche" ("Stand up and walk") by Hervé Bazin

His work
In February 1991, doing homage to Daniel du Janerand, his colleague and close friend Maurice Boitel wrote in the catalogue of the exhibition for the centenary of the Fine Arts National Society:

"...Daniel du Janerand left some unfinished pictures among which one on his easel: last testimony.
Until the last day, he was painting, going more and more to a very sober expression, more and more to the essential of his deepest feelings: his wonderful pastels, drawn from life, still remain as witnesses of his spontaneous inspiration and vigour magnified on the canvas; these finished works impart to you an optimism I often admired: optimism he kept even during his health ordeals; his dynamism, his hope, helped by a great talent, led to a world always better; a paradisiacal light illuminates the spectator.

Daniel du Janerand, in the conversations about our art, our life, was always lenient with the others, as the greatest. Formerly, a long time ago, we used to go together in Brie for painting. I still see him in front of his easel..."

References
Société Nationale des Beaux-Arts 1890–1990, Biennale 1991, Grand Palais année du centenaire, catalogue p. 22.

20th-century French painters
20th-century French male artists
French male painters
1919 births
1990 deaths
French portrait painters
Modern painters
French muralists